Pierre Georges Daix (24 May 1922 – 2 November 2014) was a French journalist, writer and art historian. He was a friend and biographer of Pablo Picasso.

As a young man, Daix was an ardent Stalinist. He joined the French Communist Party at the age of 17 in 1939 when the Communist Party was banned for supporting the German-Soviet pact. In July 1940, he created a student club, the Centre laïque des auberges de la jeunesse (Claj), which served as a legal screen for the clandestine Union of Communist Students.

When David Rousset (1912-1997) spoke out about Stalin's vast system of prison camps, Daix attacked him as a liar, denying that the gulag system existed in the Soviet Union, in a 16 page article in Les Lettres Françaises, entitled "Pourquoi M. David Rousset a-t-il inventé les camps soviétiques?". Rousset brought libel charges against Daix and there was a public trial in France, which Rousset, who had told the truth about the camps, won in 1950.  As a French communist, Daix continued his uncritical support for the Soviet Union for many years, though late in life he admitted he had been wrong.

From 1980 to 1985, he was a journalist for Le Quotidien de Paris.

References

1922 births
2014 deaths
French journalists
French art critics
French biographers
French male writers
Burials at Ivry Cemetery